La Première ("The First") is a national French-language radio channel produced by the Belgian public broadcasting organization Radio télévision belge de la communauté française (RTBF).

It is a "generalist" station carrying a wide range of principally spoken-word and information-based programming, and is RTBF's main radio news channel.

It is broadcast on FM, and digital (DAB and DVB-T), as well as being streamed on the internet. It has been announced that the Medium Wave service on 621 kHz from the Wavre transmitter has already ceased on 31 December 2018.

See also
RTBF

References

External links
www.lapremiere.be

1923 establishments in Belgium
French-language radio stations in Belgium
Radio stations established in 1923
News and talk radio stations